The 2nd South Carolina Cavalry Regiment was a cavalry regiment made from the Hampton's Legion cavalry Battalion. The 2nd served for most of the American Civil War mounted until the near end when dismounted.

Formation
The 2nd South Carolina Cavalry was formed on August 22, 1862, by consolidating the 4th South Carolina Cavalry Battalion and the Hampton's Legion Cavalry Battalion. At formation, the 2nd had ten companies recruited mainly from the low country and the midlands of South Carolina.

See also
List of South Carolina Confederate Civil War units

Units and formations of the Confederate States Army from South Carolina
Military units and formations established in 1862
1862 establishments in South Carolina